Abdellatif Mekki (born 1962) is a Tunisian politician. He is the Minister of Public Health under Prime Minister Ilyes Fakhfakh.

Biography

Early life
Abdellatif Mekki was born in 1962 in El Ksour. He holds a degree in biochemistry. While at university, he served as Secretary General of the student union Union Générale des Etudiants de Tunisie (UGET).

Politics
He was Head of the Ennahda Movement. As a result, he was jailed from 1991 to 2001. On 20 December 2011, he joined the Jebali Cabinet as Minister of Public Health. He is also a member of the Constituent Assembly of Tunisia.

References

1962 births
Government ministers of Tunisia
Living people
Ennahda politicians
Tunisian Muslims
Members of the Constituent Assembly of Tunisia
Members of the Assembly of the Representatives of the People